Stainforth is a civil parish in the metropolitan borough of Doncaster, South Yorkshire, England.  The parish contains 13 listed buildings that are recorded in the National Heritage List for England.  All the listed buildings are designated at Grade II, the lowest of the three grades, which is applied to "buildings of national importance and special interest".  The parish contains the town of Stainforth and the village of South Bramwith, and the surrounding area.  The buildings include a small country house, which is listed together with associated structures.  The other listed buildings include smaller houses and cottages,  a farmhouse and farm buildings, a swing bridge, a war memorial, and two headstocks from a former colliery.


Buildings

References

Citations

Sources

 

Lists of listed buildings in South Yorkshire
Buildings and structures in the Metropolitan Borough of Doncaster